Lake Ida or Ida Lake may refer to:

Lake Ida (Frostproof, Florida), a lake on the north side of Frostproof, Florida
Ida Lake, a lake in Blue Earth County, Minnesota
Lake Ida (Douglas County, Minnesota)
Lake Ida Township, Norman County, Minnesota
Lake Ida (Washington)